is a railway station on the Ban'etsu West Line in the city of Kitakata, Fukushima Prefecture,  Japan, operated by East Japan Railway Company (JR East).

Lines

Station layout
Ogino Station has one side platform serving a single bi-directional track. The station is staffed.

History
Ogino Station opened on November 1, 1914. A new station building was completed in 1978. The station was absorbed into the JR East network upon the privatization of the Japanese National Railways (JNR) on April 1, 1987.

Passenger statistics
In fiscal 2017, the station was used by an average of 20 passengers daily (boarding passengers only).

Surrounding area
 Aizu-Takasato Post Office
former Takasato village hall
Aga River

See also
 List of railway stations in Japan

References

External links

 JR East Station information 

Railway stations in Fukushima Prefecture
Ban'etsu West Line
Railway stations in Japan opened in 1914
Kitakata, Fukushima